Thomas Williams, Baron Williams of Barnburgh, PC (18 March 1888 – 29 March 1967) was a British coal miner who became a Labour Party politician.

Career
Born in Blackwell, Derbyshire, Williams grew up in Swinton in Yorkshire, and began work in 1899 in Kilnhurst colliery. He became involved in trade unionism and joined the Independent Labour Party, switching briefly to the British Socialist Party during World War I before joining the Labour Party. In 1918, he was elected as a Labour member of the Bolton-upon-Dearne Urban District Council.

He was elected at the 1922 general election as the Member of Parliament (MP) for Don Valley, and held the seat until he stepped down at the 1959 general election.

In Parliament
In the First Labour Government, from January to October 1924, Williams was Parliamentary Private Secretary (PPS) to Noel Buxton, the Minister of Agriculture. In the Second Labour Government from 1929 to 1931, he was PPS to the Minister of Labour, Margaret Bondfield.

Williams first held ministerial office in Winston Churchill's wartime Coalition Government, when he was Parliamentary Secretary to the Ministry of Agriculture and Fisheries from 1940 to 1945, serving under the Conservative minister Robert Hudson. He was made a Privy Counsellor in August 1941. In Clement Attlee's post-war Labour government, he was Minister of Agriculture, Fisheries and Food from 1945 to 1951, and after Labour lost the 1951 general election he was the opposition spokesperson on Agriculture until 1959.

After his retirement from the House of Commons in 1959, he was created a life peer on 2 February 1961 taking the title Baron Williams of Barnburgh, of Barnburgh in the West Riding of the County of York.

His autobiography, in which he gives an account of his life since childhood, was published in 1965 with a foreword by Clement Attlee.

References

External links
 
 

1888 births
1967 deaths
Agriculture ministers of the United Kingdom
British Socialist Party members
British coal miners
Councillors in South Yorkshire
English miners
Labour Party (UK) MPs for English constituencies
Labour Party (UK) councillors
Williams of Barnburgh
Members of the Privy Council of the United Kingdom
Miners' Federation of Great Britain-sponsored MPs
Ministers in the Churchill wartime government, 1940–1945
National Union of Mineworkers-sponsored MPs
People from Blackwell, Derbyshire
People from Swinton, South Yorkshire
UK MPs 1922–1923
UK MPs 1923–1924
UK MPs 1924–1929
UK MPs 1929–1931
UK MPs 1931–1935
UK MPs 1935–1945
UK MPs 1945–1950
UK MPs 1950–1951
UK MPs 1951–1955
UK MPs 1955–1959
UK MPs who were granted peerages
Ministers in the Attlee governments, 1945–1951
Life peers created by Elizabeth II